Carl Öst, (19 January 1908 in Alfta Parish – 13 February 1988 in Ovanåker Parish) was a Swedish singer and musician playing the violin and guitar. Originally playing folk music, he later switched to Christian music.

Discography

Albums
1968 Hemmakväll hos familjen Carl Öst
1971 Carl Öst sjunger och spelar; Theofil Engström sjunger och spelar
1973 Calle Östs bästa
1975 Sånger för stora och små
1978 Stugmöte

Singles and EP records
1957 Vi har kommit ombord
1958 Nu är jag lycklig
1959 Jag får räkna med Jesus i allt
1959 Jag vill ha mycket, mycket mer
1960 Han gör inga misstag
1961 Härliga morgon
1964 Jag seglar hem
1963 Pelle
1965 Sången om Jesus
1966 Vi skall fara bortom månen
1967 Han står vid rodret

References

1908 births
1988 deaths
Swedish guitarists
Male guitarists
Swedish violinists
Male violinists
20th-century violinists
20th-century Swedish male singers
20th-century guitarists